The Second League of Yugoslavia's 1991/1992 season was the last in which teams from Bosnia and Herzegovina and Macedonia participated, as well as the last of the Socialist Federal Republic of Yugoslavia in general as the Second League of FR Yugoslavia was established the following season. In 1992 these republics declared their independence from Yugoslavia. The clubs from Croatia and Slovenia were already playing their first seasons as separate nations.

Teams

Season overview
FK Bečej was the league champion with 49 points, and together with FK Hajduk Kula, FK Radnički Beograd, FK Mogren, OFK Kikinda, FK Priština and FK Napredak Kruševac getting the promotion to the 1992–93 First League of FR Yugoslavia.

FK Sloboda Užice, FK Radnički Kragujevac, FK Mačva Šabac, FK Borac Čačak, FK Vrbas, FK Jedinstvo Bijelo Polje and FK Bor booked their places in next seasons 1992–93 Second League of FR Yugoslavia.

FK Teteks, that finished 12 and would eventually have maintained their status, along with eventually relegated FK Balkan Skopje, became members of the 1992–93 First Macedonian Football League in next season. The rest of the clubs that would eventually be relegated were all from the territory of Bosnia and Herzegovina, and all left the Yugoslav league system.

Final table

See also
1991–92 Yugoslav First League
1991–92 Yugoslav Cup

External sources
 Season tables at FSGZ

Yugoslav Second League seasons
Yugo
2